Armando Santiago (born 18 June 1932) is a Canadian composer, conductor, music educator, and university administrator of Portuguese birth. A member of the Canadian League of Composers, his compositional output includes a considerable amount of orchestral works and chamber works. From 1974 to 1978 he was the director of the Conservatoire de musique du Québec à Trois-Rivières and from 1978–1985 he was the director of the Conservatoire de musique du Québec à Québec.

Early life and education
Born in Lisbon, Santiago became a naturalized Canadian citizen in 1972. He studied singing and piano privately in his native city before entering the Lisbon Conservatory where he earned a premier prix in music history (1954) and music composition (1960). He then studied the techniques of musique concrète with Pierre Schaeffer through the research service of the Office de Radiodiffusion Télévision Française in Paris in 1960. From 1962 to 1964 he studied in Rome with Boris Porena privately and with Goffredo Petrassi at the Accademia Nazionale di Santa Cecilia through grants awarded to him by the governments of Portugal and Italy. He obtained an advanced studies diploma in music composition from the Accademia in 1964. He also pursued studies in conducting with Hans Münch in Lisbon and Franco Ferrara in Siena.

Career
Santiago taught classes in music theory, composition, and conducting in Lisbon during the 1960s. He emigrated to Canada in 1968 to join the music faculty at the Conservatoire de musique du Québec à Trois-Rivières. He became the director of that school in 1974, and founded its orchestra. In 1978 he was appointed director of the Conservatoire de musique du Québec à Québec. Among his notable pupils are Pierre-Michel Bédard and Gilles Bellemare.
 
In 1977–1978 Santiago conducted performances of his compositions played by the CBC Quebec Chamber Orchestra. He has also worked as a guest conductor with orchestras in Portugal, Germany, and Canada during the 1970s and 1980s.

A theatre at the Conservatoire de musique du Québec à Trois-Rivières is named for him.

Compositions
Some of Santiago's more well known compositions are Suite for bassoon and piano (1960), Soneto de Camões for baritone and string orchestra (1966), Sinfonia (1966, written for the Jeunesses musicales du Canada), Sonata (1968, commissioned by the University of Lisbon), Simetrias (1970), Prismes (1970), Heterogenia-Movimento per 32 solisti (1971, commissioned by the Gulbenkian Foundation of Lisbon), Requies for male choir and 25 instruments (1979–83), Undecassônia (1975) and Trame (1985–9) for orchestra, and Musique pour quatre (1988). In 1962 he composed the film score for Ernesto de Sousa's Dom Roberto.

References

1932 births
Living people
People from Lisbon
Accademia Nazionale di Santa Cecilia alumni
Academic staff of the Conservatoire de musique du Québec à Québec
Academic staff of the Conservatoire de musique du Québec à Trois-Rivières
Canadian music educators
Male conductors (music)
Canadian male composers
Musicians from Lisbon
Naturalized citizens of Canada
Portuguese emigrants to Canada
21st-century Canadian composers
21st-century Canadian conductors (music)
21st-century Canadian male musicians